Castle Howard railway station was a minor railway station serving the village of Welburn and the stately home at Castle Howard in North Yorkshire, England. On the York to Scarborough Line it was opened on 5 July 1845 by the York and North Midland Railway. The architect was George Townsend Andrews. It closed to passenger traffic on 22 September 1930 but continued to be staffed until the 1950s for small volumes of freight and parcels.

The station was often used by the aristocracy, notably Queen Victoria when she visited Castle Howard with Prince Albert as a guest of Earl of Carlisle in August 1850. The station is now a private residence.

Castle Howard station was featured in the British TV documentary The Architecture the Railways Built presented by historian Tim Dunn on Yesterday in 2020.

References

External links

 Castle Howard Station Website – An historic record featuring a timeline, image bank and personal memories relating to the station
 Castle Howard station on navigable 1947 O. S. map

Disused railway stations in North Yorkshire
Railway stations in Great Britain opened in 1845
Railway stations in Great Britain closed in 1930
Former York and North Midland Railway stations
George Townsend Andrews railway stations